Singu is a town in the Mandalay Region of central Myanmar. It is the capital of Singu Township.

Geography
Singu is located by the Irrawaddy about 55 km to the south of Letha Taung, also known as the Singu Plateau.

References

External links
Satellite map at Maplandia.com

Populated places in Mandalay Region
Township capitals of Myanmar